The 2014/15 FIS Ski Jumping Alpen Cup was the 25th Alpen Cup season in ski jumping for men and the 7th for ladies. It began on 13 August 2014 in Pöhla, Germany and ended on 8 March 2015 in Chaux-Neuve, France.

Other competitive circuits this season included the World Cup, Grand Prix and Continental Cup.

Calendar

Men

Ladies

Overall standings

Men

Ladies

References

2014 in ski jumping
2015 in ski jumping
FIS Ski Jumping Alpen Cup